Caitlin Cooper (born 12 February 1988) is an Australian soccer player, who plays for the Western Sydney Wanderers in the Australian W-League. She has previously played for Central Coast Mariners, Canberra United and Sydney FC.

Club career

Central Coast Mariners, 2008–2010
Cooper was the inaugural captain for the Mariners and she made her debut against Melbourne Victory on Saturday, 25 October 2008.

Canberra United, 2010–2013
In three season at Canberra United, Cooper appeared in 34 games and scored 3 goals. In the 2011–12 season Canberra won the Premiership and the W-League Championship.

Western Sydney Wanderers, 2013–2017
Cooper joined the Western Sydney Wanderers ahead of the 2013–14 season. She made 40 appearances for the club over 4 seasons.

Sydney FC, 2017–2018
Cooper joined Sydney FC ahead of the 2017–18 season. Sydney FC made it all the way to the 2018 Grand Final, where they lost to Melbourne City 2–0.

Western Sydney Wanderers, 2018–present
Cooper would return to the Western Sydney Wanderers for the 2018–19 season.

Cooper was crowned the W-League team's Wanderers Medal for Player of the Year in 2021 and was also named the club's W-League Members’ Player of the Year in 2021 after impressive performances in every single match this season.

Cooper currently holds the all time games record for the Wanderers.

International career
Cooper made her debut for the Matildas in 2007 in a 2008 Olympic Qualifying game against Hong Kong. Her next call-up did not occur until June 2012.

Cooper was part of the Matildas squad that won the 2017 Tournament of Nations and defeated the United States for the first time ever.

In April 2018, Cooper was named to the Australian team for the 2018 AFC Women's Asian Cup, but she did not appear in any games. Australia finished Runner-up to Japan and qualified for the 2019 FIFA Women's World Cup.

In May 2021, Cooper was recalled to the Matildas camp and was then selected in the 25 person squad for the Matildas friendlies with Denmark and Sweden ahead of the 2022 Tokyo Olympic Games.

Honours

Club
Canberra United
 W-League Championship: 2011–12
 W-League Premiership: 2011–12

International
 AFC Olympic Qualifying Tournament: 2016
Tournament of Nations: 2017

Career statistics

International goals

References

External links
 
 

 

 

1988 births
Living people
Australian women's soccer players
Central Coast Mariners FC (A-League Women) players
Canberra United FC players
Western Sydney Wanderers FC (A-League Women) players
Sydney FC (A-League Women) players
A-League Women players
Women's association football defenders
People from the Mid North Coast
Sportswomen from New South Wales
Soccer players from New South Wales
Australia women's international soccer players
21st-century Australian women